Thelopsis is a genus of lichenized fungi in the family Stictidaceae. It was circumscribed by Finnish lichenologist William Nylander in 1855, with Thelopsis rubella as the type species.

Species
Thelopsis africana  – Cape Verde
Thelopsis chirisanensis  – South Korea
Thelopsis cruciata  – Brazil
Thelopsis gangwondoensis  – South Korea
Thelopsis isiaca 
Thelopsis loekoesii  – South Korea
Thelopsis melathelia 
Thelopsis muriformis  – South Korea
Thelopsis paucispora  – Socotra
Thelopsis rubella 
Thelopsis ullungdoensis  – South Korea

References

Ostropales
Lichen genera
Ostropales genera
Taxa named by William Nylander (botanist)
Taxa described in 1855